USA Track & Field (USATF) is the United States national governing body for the sports of track and field, cross country running, road running and racewalking (known as the sport of athletics outside the US).  The USATF was known between 1979 and 1992 as The Athletics Congress (TAC) after its spin off from the Amateur Athletic Union (AAU), which governed the sport in the US through most of the 20th century until the Amateur Sports Act of 1978 dissolved its responsibility.
Based in Indianapolis, USATF is a non-profit organization with a membership of more than 130,000.  The organization has three key leadership positions: CEO Max Siegel, Board of Directors Chair Steve Miller, and elected President Vin Lananna. U.S. citizens and permanent residents can be USATF members (annual individual membership fee: $25 for 18-year-old member and younger, $40 for the rest), but permanent residents can only participate in masters events in the country, per World Athletics regulations.

USA Track & Field is involved in many aspects of the sport at the local, national, and international level – providing the rules, officials, coaching education, sports science and athlete development, youth programs, masters (age 25+) competition, the National Track & Field Hall of Fame, and an annual meeting. It also organizes the annual USA Track & Field Outdoor Championships, the USA Track & Field Indoor Championships, the USA Cross Country Championships, the USATF National Club Cross Country Championships and the USATF National Club Track & Field Championships. Through its sanctioning program, the national body provides the insurance coverage necessary for members to rent facilities, thus allowing for competitive opportunities for all athletes to happen. USA Track and Field has held National Conventions since the 1870s or 1880s x NAAA Track and Field Championship and Convention locations, Dec 3-6, 2020 was held virtually; earlier announced  USA Track & Field | 2020 USATF Annual Meeting to be held virtually instead of face to face.

History

On April 22, 1879 National Association of Amateur Athletes of America (NAAA) was formed and later replaced by the AAU x NAAA Track and Field Championship and Convention locations  On January 21, 1888, in the city of New York, rower and runner William B. Curtis and James Edward Sullivan founded what officially became, the Amateur Athletic Union (AAU) x AAU Convention Locations.  The AAU governed the sport of track and field in the United States until 1979, when the first Amateur Sports Act of 1978 decreed that the AAU could no longer hold international franchises for more than one sport.  The enactment of the Amateur Sports Act was prompted by lobbying by athletes, particularly runners, who felt that the AAU imposed artificial rules preventing widespread participation in sports.

The Athletics Congress (TAC) emerged from the AAU in late 1979, when its first annual meeting was conducted in Las Vegas, in conjunction with the annual AAU Convention.  A constitutional convention was subsequently held in Dallas–Fort Worth in 1980.

In 1992, TAC changed its name to USA Track & Field (USATF) to increase recognition for the organization and for the sport in the United States.  However, USATF inherited from AAU the 57 regional associations which are responsible for promoting the sport in a particular state or locality.  Many of these associations were viewed as unaccountable to their members and some were accused of operating in a racially discriminatory manner. In addition, in some areas, the AAU continues to organize track and field events, including youth running programs.

In response, the USATF restructured the Associations, and adopted Regulation 15, which set minimum standards for association performance and called for biannual accreditation of each association under those standards.

In May 2008, the United States Olympic Committee notified USATF that its governance was deficient and threatened to remove its national governing body status unless major reforms were made.  In response, at USATF's December 2008 Convention, the size of its board of directors was reduced from 31 members who had represented constituencies within the organization to 15, and none of the new directors could have an operating role in the organization.  Most of the new board members represented sponsoring organizations.  On February 18, 2009, the members of the new, reduced Board were announced.

2020 Olympic Trials held in 2021
The United States Olympic & Paralympic Committee (USOPC) and the TrackTown USA Local Organizing Committee announced the release of the updated competition schedule for the postponed 2020 U.S. Olympic Team Trials – Track and Field, that took place in June 18–27, 2021, at Hayward Field in Eugene, Oregon.

Recent Highlights
Since the founding of the new board and the hiring of Siegel as CEO, USATF in 2016 achieved his highest medal count at an Olympics since 1936 (32) and its most-ever medals at a world championships, by winning 30 at the 2017 IAAF World Championships. The organization has seen explosive growth of its budget and sponsor ranks, with the annual budget growing from $22M to nearly $37M. In 2016, it established an "Athlete Revenue Distribution Model" that provided additional money to elite athletes.

Controversy
At the 2014 annual meeting, the member delegates voted 392–70 to re-nominate Robert Hersh as the USATF's nominee to the IAAF council.  At the time, Hersh was the sitting senior vice-president of the IAAF council and by virtue of that position, a USATF board member. However, the reconstituted Board disregarded the vote of the member delegates and instead voted 11–1 to nominate president Stephanie Hightower as the nominee to the IAAF council. The Board's action caused such a controversy that USATF sent an email two days later to all of its members attempting to explain its action. The email wrote, "This is a different era and a different time. We think Stephanie Hightower provides us with the best chance to move forward as part of that change." Hightower later that summer, at the IAAF Congress, was elected to IAAF Council with the most votes of all candidates and led to all USATF candidates for IAAF positions being elected. In 2018, after serving on the IAAF Council for four years, Hightower came up for reelection.  She was defeated by a vote of the delegates in favor of Willie Banks.

In 2016, Vin Lananna was elected president of USATF.  On February 18, 2018, Lananna was place on "temporary administrative leave" pending a federal investigation by the Federal Bureau of Investigation and Internal Revenue Service into possible criminal conflict of interest in regards to the awarding of the 2021 World Championships in Athletics to Eugene, Oregon. Lananna was also the long time president of TrackTown USA, the hosting organization for the World Championships and had hosted the 2016 IAAF World Indoor Championships.  Lananna is also an Associate Athletic Director at the University of Oregon, the host stadium of the event. Lamine Diack was the IAAF president in April 2015 at the time of the award and is under house arrest in France on charges of corruption.  The 2021 Championships was awarded in an unconventional fashion, without the usual formal bidding process.  The selection of the host city was announced on April 16, 2015 in Beijing. Eugene previously did put in a bid for the 2019 World Championships, losing to Qatar. The choice of Eugene will make the 2021 event the first held in the United States. Runner's World magazine reported that Eugene's selection by World Athletics, then known as the International Association of Athletics Federations, was an "unusual move". They report the choice of Eugene will make the 2021 event "the first held in the United States." The event will be the second held in North America, after Edmonton, Alberta, Canada in 2001. The Guardian reported that the lack of bidding triggered concern in European cities that had bid to host the event.
They quoted Lamine Diack, IAAF president, who justified the lack of bidding with the claim the selection of Eugene to host the event, "enables us to take advantage of a unique opportunity to host a financially successful tournament that may never arise again."

Despite this, the lack of bidding for the 2021 event was not unprecedented: the 2007 World Championships were awarded to Osaka, Japan, without bidding. On July 17, 2018, Lananna also resigned as president of TrackTown USA, but has not left his position at the University.  Since February 18, 2018, the interim USATF president has been Mike Conley.

Affiliations
USA Track & Field is the International Association of Athletics Federations (IAAF) member federation in the United States.  USATF is a member of the United States Olympic Committee (USOC) and selects teams for Olympic and Pan American Games competitions.  To select the athletes for the Olympic Games, every Olympiad USATF conducts the Olympic Trials.

USATF also has membership in, or close affiliations with, the NCAA, the National Federation of State High School Associations (NFHS), the Road Runners Club of America (RRCA), Running USA, and many community-based and disabled sports organizations.

USA Track & Field is a Founding Sports Partner of the Sports Museum of America, joining more than 50 other single-sport Halls of Fame, National Governing Bodies, Museums and other organizations across North America to richly celebrate the history, grandeur and significance of sports in American culture. Set to open in New York City on May 7, 2008, the Sports Museum of America will showcase both USA Track & Field and the National Track & Field Hall of Fame in its Hall of Halls Gallery (along with providing an annual donation) in return for sharing some of the hall of fame's valuable artifacts and their support of the creation of the Nation's first all-sports museum experience.

Associations
USATF is composed of 57 Associations, which are the localized administrative districts.  For competition, each association is obligated to conduct (local) association championships.  This is the initial rung in the competition tournaments that lead to various national championships, though many national championships do not require participation at the lower level.  Generally the associations follow state borders, but in the cases of smaller states, several states are combined into one association and in the case of larger states, the state is divided into multiple associations in order to more effectively serve clusters of the population base.  Most association borders parallel the initial associations created by the AAU, though there has been some adjustment to those defined borders since, including the creation of new associations.  Dependent upon the association fulfilling its obligations to its membership and the number of members in the association, each association is allowed to send a delegation of representatives to the National Meeting in early December each year.  This is the primary means through which the local constituents are able to have a voice in the direction the national organization.  Individual members may also attend the meetings, though voting is carefully controlled by the by-laws, based on the participation of various constituent groups.  The National Meeting is the only time political business, rule changes and record ratification can be transacted by most wings of the organization.

Competitors
Many of the more than 130,000 members of USATF participate in athletics competitions through one of the thousands of clubs established in all 50 states. While most of these members participate as athletes, coaches, officials and supporters of athletics at the grass roots level, elite athletes who represent the US in international competition are also required to be members of USATF. USATF also has 57 Associations to promote the sport locally, and membership in USATF also constitutes membership in a local association, with the dues being divided between the national and local group.

During the 1980s and 1990s, USATF encouraged major marathons to require USATF membership as a prerequisite to entering those races.  However, all marathons dropped this requirement for non-elite runners, causing the adult membership in USATF to drop dramatically in the 2000s.  In some USATF associations, the number of youth members far exceeds the number of adult members.

Today, USATF competes for youth membership with a parallel effort from the AAU, and with road racer/adult recreational runner membership with the Road Runners Club of America (RRCA) and its member clubs.  In many cases, youth track clubs join both USATF and AAU so that they can compete in both sets of track meets, and adult running clubs join both RRCA and USATF.  However, unlike USATF which requires each individual runner to also become a member of USATF in order to compete in events or gain other membership benefits, when a club joins RRCA, all of its members automatically become members of RRCA as well. As a result, RRCA has grown to 180,000 individual or family members compared with 130,000 USATF members, many of whom are children.

To the general public, the similarity in terminology used by the organizations' events can lead to confusion.  For example, both USATF and AAU conduct a series of track meets called the Junior Olympics and USATF, AAU and RRCA conduct separate National Championships and State Championships.  Both AAU and USATF operate 57 state or local Associations, although the boundaries of their service areas are no longer exactly the same.

Regarding the funding of promising post-collegiate athletes, USATF competes with RRCA's Road Scholars program to select athletes for stipends.

Championship series
In 1999, the USATF established the Golden Spike Tour – later the Visa Championship Series (VCS) – to showcase track and field in America and to facilitate the broadcast of key events on national television networks.  Using innovative meet formats, the VCS helps repackage the sport, draws new fans and new sponsors, and provides increased financial incentives for USATF athletes.  The VCS fills indoor arenas and outdoor stadiums across the country.  Athletes compete for prize money at each meet, and the top athletes share in a bonus pool of $100,000.  The last meet of the season is the USA Track & Field Indoor Championships. Most focus on the USA Track & Field Outdoor Championships to make IAAF World Championships in Athletics and Athletics at the Summer Olympics teams.

USA Masters Track and Field Championship

Masters athletics has several Championship competitions:

 USATF Masters Outdoor Championships began July 1968 and have been held every year (except 2020).
 USATF Masters Indoor Championships began March 1975 and have been held every year (except 2020).
 USA Track and Field is considering (2020) adding the 25-29 age bracket for the USA National Masters Outdoor Track and Field Championship.  Age 30-34 is already competing at the USA National Masters Outdoor Track and Field Championship.
 World Masters Athletics Championships began August 1975 in Canada and continue to today.

Legend Coach Award 

The USA Track & Field Legend Coach Award is an annual award to a single recipient selected by the USATF Coaches Advisory Committee.

The award ceremony takes place at the annual USATF Outdoor Championships.

Recipients of the award started in 2014 are:
 2014 Ed Temple
 2015 Joe Vigil
 2016 Tom Tellez
 2017 Clyde Hart
 2018 Brooks Johnson
 2019 Bob Larsen
 2020 No Award
 2021 Bill Dellinger
 2022 George Williams

Resources

 Mastersrankings

References

External links
USA Track & Field official website
 USATF website
 USATF Masters website
 World Masters Athletics (WMA)
 SCA USATF
 Mastershistory.org website
 National Masters News magazine
 World Masters Rankings
 North and Central America and Caribbean Region of World Masters Athletics   (NCCMA)
 Southern California Striders
 Club West track club
 List of USA Masters Track and Field Records Masters Track and Field Record Lookup - Home  Masters Records American 

USATF American Records

United States
1979 establishments in the United States
Track and Field
Track and field in the United States
National governing bodies for athletics
Sports organizations established in 1979
Non-profit organizations based in Indianapolis
Track and field organizations